Vera Čukić (born 16 December 1938) is a Serbian actress. She appeared in more than sixty films since 1958.

Selected filmography

References

External links 

1938 births
Living people
Actresses from Belgrade
Serbian film actresses